Planiemen is a genus of jumping spider erected in 2007 for the sole species Planiemen rotundus, formerly placed in the genus Pachyballus. It is endemic to Yemen.

This dark-colored species is almost round in appearance.

References

External links
 Photographs of P. rotundus

Endemic fauna of Yemen
Monotypic Salticidae genera
Salticidae
Taxa named by Wanda Wesołowska
Spiders of Asia